The Defiant Ones is a 1958 American adventure drama film which tells the story of two escaped prisoners, one white and one black, who are shackled together and who must co-operate in order to survive. It stars Tony Curtis and Sidney Poitier.

The film was adapted by Harold Jacob Smith from the story by Nedrick Young, originally credited as Nathan E. Douglas. It was produced and directed by Stanley Kramer.

The film was highly regarded at the time of its release; it won Academy Awards for Cinematography (Black-and-White) and Original Screenplay and was nominated for seven others, including Best Picture and Best Actor for both Poitier and Curtis. Poitier won the Silver Bear for Best Actor at the Berlin International Film Festival.

Plot
One night in the Southern United States, a truck loaded with prisoners swerves to avoid another truck and crashes through a barrier. The rescuers clear up the debris and discover two prisoners have escaped, a black man shackled to a white man because "the warden had a sense of humor." They are told not to look too hard as "they will probably kill each other in the first five miles." Nevertheless, a large posse and many bloodhounds are dispatched the next morning to find them. The two missing men are Noah Cullen and John "Joker" Jackson. Despite their mutual hatred, they are forced to cooperate, as they are chained together. At first their cooperation is motivated by self-preservation, but gradually they begin to respect and like each other.

Cullen and Joker flee through difficult terrain and weather, with a brief stop at a turpentine camp where they attempt to break into a general store, in hopes of obtaining food and tools to break the chain. Instead, they are captured by the inhabitants, who form a lynch mob; they are saved only by the interference of "Big" Sam, a man who is appalled by his neighbors' bloodthirst. Sam persuades the onlookers to lock the convicts up and turn them in the next morning. That night, he secretly releases them, being a former chain-gang prisoner himself.

Finally, they run into a young boy named Billy. They make him take them to his home and his mother, whose husband has abandoned his family. The escapees are finally able to break their chains. When they spend the night there, the lonely woman is attracted to Joker and wants to run off with him. She advises Cullen to go through the swamp to reach the railroad tracks, while she and Joker will drive off in her car. However, after Cullen leaves, the woman reveals that she had lied: she has sent Cullen into the dangerous swamp to die, to eliminate any chance he would be captured and reveal where Joker had gone. Furious, Joker runs after his friend; as he leaves, Billy shoots him.

Wounded, Joker catches up with Cullen and warns him about the swamp. The posse led by humane sheriff Max Muller gets close. The two hear a train whistle and run toward it. Cullen catches up to the train and jumps aboard. Joker runs alongside, desperately trying to catch up. Cullen calls to Joker and holds out his hand. Their hands clasp, but Cullen is unable to pull Joker aboard. Both men tumble to the ground. Too exhausted to run, they realize all they can do is wait for their pursuers. The sheriff finds Cullen singing defiantly and Joker lying in his arms.

Cast

Production
Robert Mitchum, a veteran of a Southern chain gang, turned down the role of Jackson because he believed black and white people would not be chained together in the segregated South at that time. Mitchum’s reasoning was misinterpreted over the years into the claim that he turned down the film because of his refusal to work with a black man. Kramer wrote that Poitier was initially unsure of Curtis' casting but became supportive. Curtis, however, denied this; he stated that he had contractual rights to approve who would play Cullen. However, despite Curtis' many later claims and stories, Kramer had originally cast Poitier and Marlon Brando as the two leads when a previous contractual obligation prevented Poitier from being able to accept the role. Kramer wanted Poitier for the role so badly that he delayed the film's production, which led to Brando having to decline because the delay caused shooting to overlap with another obligation. Curtis was cast afterwards. Curtis did request Poitier's name appear with his above the movie title marking a first for Poitier in his career.

Carl Switzer, of the Our Gang comedies, has a small role. It was his last before his death.

Reception
The film earned rentals of $2.5 million in the United States and Canada but did not perform as well overseas. It ultimately made a profit of $1 million.

Critical response
When the film was originally released, Bosley Crowther, film critic for The New York Times, lauded the production and the acting in the film, writing, "A remarkably apt and dramatic visualization of a social idea—the idea of men of different races brought together to face misfortune in a bond of brotherhood—is achieved by producer Stanley Kramer in his new film, The Defiant Ones... Between the two principal performers there isn't much room for a choice. Mr. Poitier stands out as the Negro convict and Mr. Curtis is surprisingly good. Both men are intensely dynamic. Mr. Poitier shows a deep and powerful strain of underlying compassion...In the ranks of the pursuers, Theodore Bikel is most impressive as a sheriff with a streak of mercy and justice, which he has to fight to maintain against a brutish state policeman, played by Charles McGraw."

Variety magazine likewise praised the acting and discussed the film's major theme, writing, "The theme of The Defiant Ones is that what keeps men apart is their lack of knowledge of one another. With that knowledge comes respect, and with respect comradeship and even love. This thesis is exercised in terms of a colored and a white man, both convicts chained together as they make their break for freedom from a Southern prison gang. The performances by Tony Curtis and Sidney Poitier are virtually flawless. Poitier captures all of the moody violence of the convict, serving time because he assaulted a white man who had insulted him. It is a cunning, totally intelligent portrayal that rings powerfully true...Curtis delivers a true surprise performance. He starts off as a sneering, brutal character, willing to fight it out to-the-death with his equally stubborn companion. When, in the end, he sacrifices a dash for freedom to save Poitier, by saving him from the swamp, he has managed the transition with such skill that sympathy is completely with him."

On Rotten Tomatoes, the film holds a rating of 91% from 54 reviews.

Awards and nominations

Remakes and parodies
The basis of The Defiant Ones was revisited several times in popular media:

 Lenny Bruce parodied the film in his bit The Defiant Ones from his album I Am Not A Nut, Elect Me.
 Warner Bros. parodied the film in Friz Freleng's 1961 cartoon D' Fightin' Ones, in which Sylvester the Cat escapes from captivity in a dogcatcher truck while chained to a bulldog.
 On his 1964 debut LP, Godfrey Cambridge parodied the film, re-writing the final scene so that Cullen makes it onto the train without his white companion, to which Cullen (played by Cambridge) says, "Byeeee, baby...!"
 In 1972, the story changed the gender of the protagonists in the film Black Mama White Mama, starring Pam Grier and Margaret Markov.
 Another 1972 B-movie added a science fiction blaxploitation twist as The Thing with Two Heads, in which a racist white man (played by Ray Milland) has his head grafted onto the body of a living black man (played by Rosey Grier).
 In 1986, the film was remade for television, starring Robert Urich and Carl Weathers. 
 The film was paid homage to by the 1992 Quantum Leap episode "Unchained", in which protagonist Sam Beckett lands in the body of a white Mississippi road-gang worker chained to a wrongly convicted black man, and the two must escape together or be murdered by the corrupt warden.
 In 1996, the film was remade as Fled, starring Laurence Fishburne and Stephen Baldwin.
 The 2018 western video game Red Dead Redemption 2 features an optional questline where the player can help two chain gang escapees, a white man named Mr. Black and a black man named Mr. White, evade the law after being wrongfully convicted of a crime, or hand them over to the authorities for their bounties. 
 A pair of Marvel Comics supervillains called Hammer and Anvil were parodies of the film's leads.
 The film was unofficially remade in Hindi by Bollywood (Indian cinema) titled Kachche Dhaage starring Ajay Devgan & Saif Ali Khan. The story was changed to a different setting to enable the protagonists to be chained together while settling their differences on the run.
 The 1987 G.I. Joe the Movie has the temporarily blinded Roadblock and the former Cobra Commander working together to escape Cobra-La; this was a deliberate reference to The Defiant Ones by writer Buzz Dixon, as admitted in the commentary for the 25th anniversary Blu-ray edition.
In his second autobiography Why Me, Sammy Davis Jr. revealed that Elvis Presley wanted to star alongside him in this film. However, Colonel Tom Parker, Presley’s manager, was against it.

See also
 List of American films of 1958

References

External links

 
 
 
 
 
 "The Defiant Ones" at Every Oscar Ever

1958 crime drama films
1958 films
American black-and-white films
American buddy drama films
American chase films
American crime drama films
Best Drama Picture Golden Globe winners
Curtleigh Productions films
Edgar Award-winning works
1950s English-language films
Films about criminals
Films about race and ethnicity
Films directed by Stanley Kramer
Films produced by Stanley Kramer
Films scored by Ernest Gold
Films whose cinematographer won the Best Cinematography Academy Award
Films whose writer won the Best Original Screenplay Academy Award
United Artists films
1950s American films